Barghat Assembly constituency is one of the 230 Vidhan Sabha (Legislative Assembly) constituencies of Madhya Pradesh state in central India.

It is part of Seoni District.

Members of the Legislative Assembly

See also
 Barghat

References

Assembly constituencies of Madhya Pradesh